Peter de Valognes (1045-1110) was a Norman noble who became a great landowner in England following the Norman Conquest.

Land holdings
Between 1070 and 1076, Peter de Valognes was granted lands in  the six counties of Hertfordshire, Cambridgeshire, Norfolk, Suffolk, Essex and Lincolnshire. In 1086, when the Domesday book was completed, Peter was sheriff of the counties of Essex and Hertfordshire and he farmed the boroughs of Havering and Hertford. Peter de Valognes made  his caput in Benington in Hertfordshire where a motte-and-bailey castle was built in the late 11th or early 12th century. Peter's most valuable lands however, were in Norfolk, the latter being a later grant at the forfeiture of Ralph de Guader after the revolt of the Earls in 1075.

Binham Priory
Peter de Valognes was the founder of Binham Priory in North Norfolk in 1091, which was built on land given to him by William the Conqueror. The land on which the priory stands was, according to the Domesday Book, originally the property of a freeman named Esket.

Marriage and issue
Peter de Valognes married Albreda de Rie, the sister of Eudo the Dapifer, and are known to have had the following known children:
Roger de Valognes, Lord of Benington, married Agnes, daughter of John FitzRichard, had issue.
Robert,
Peter, married Aubrey, daughter of William FitzNeel, Lord of Halton, and Agnes de Widness, had issue.
William, died without legitimate heirs.
Muriel, married firstly William de Bachetone and secondly Hubert de Munchensy, had issue.
daughter, married Alfred of Attleborough, had issue.

Notes

References

11th-century births
Year of death unknown
Anglo-Normans
High Sheriffs of Essex
High Sheriffs of Hertfordshire
People from Benington, Hertfordshire
Peter